The 1966 Minnesota gubernatorial election took place on November 8, 1966. Republican Party of Minnesota challenger Harold LeVander defeated Minnesota Democratic–Farmer–Labor Party incumbent Karl Rolvaag. Sandy Keith unsuccessfully ran for the Democratic nomination.

Results

External links
 http://www.sos.state.mn.us/home/index.asp?page=653
 http://www.sos.state.mn.us/home/index.asp?page=657

Minnesota
Gubernatorial
1966
November 1966 events in the United States